DNA cross-link repair 1A protein is a protein that in humans is encoded by the DCLRE1A gene.

DNA interstrand cross-links prevent strand separation, thereby physically blocking transcription, replication, and segregation of DNA. DCLRE1A is one of several evolutionarily conserved genes involved in repair of interstrand cross-links (Dronkert et al., 2000).[supplied by OMIM]

Function

The protein DCLRE1A (DNA cross-link repair 1A) is also referred to as SNM1A (sensitive to nitrogen mustard 1A).  DCLRE1A is a 5’ to 3’ exonuclease that forms a complex with the Cockayne syndrome B (CSB) protein.  In this complex, CSB modulates the exonuclease activity of DCLRE1A and coordinates the efficient assembly of DCLRE1A to sites of DNA damage.  In human cells, this complex is recruited to DNA inter-strand cross-links, a form of DNA damage.  The complex then participates in the repair of the cross-linked DNA. DCLRE1A protein is thought to be recruited by CSB to facilitate cross-link unhooking following incision 5’ to the cross-link by another complex, the ERCC1/XPF nuclease complex.  Failure of the DCLRE1A/CSB complex to carry out its repair function may contribute to the degenerative pathologies and premature aging features of Cockayne syndrome.

References

Further reading